Guo Yijun (Chinese: 郭亿军; born 23 September 1963), also spelled as Guo Jijun, is a Chinese association football coach and a former defender or midfielder who represented his country with the senior national team, and with the national 1988 Summer Olympics selection.

Management career
After retiring from playing, Guo would soon move into management and joined his former club, Guangdong as their Assistant coach in the 1994 Chinese league season. He would go on to then become their Head coach in the 1997 league season. His tenure at the club was not a success, the team were relegated from the top tier and he left the club. Guo would move into youth coaching where he worked with the  local Guangdong government, coaching the Guangdong U-16 team for the 2009 National Games of China.

References

External links
 

1963 births
Chinese footballers
Association football defenders
China international footballers
Footballers at the 1988 Summer Olympics
Olympic footballers of China
Living people
Footballers at the 1990 Asian Games
Asian Games competitors for China
20th-century Chinese people